Bearer Capability in telecommunications is one of the Information Elements (fields) of the Q.931 SETUP message. It is used by the calling party to specify the kind of B channel that is being requested.

Description
For example, if a Bearer Capability of Speech is specified, then the network is free to select a set of facilities that are able to provide this service (including, in this case, analogue trunks and routes involving echo cancellers or DCME).

If, on the other hand, a Bearer Capability of Unrestricted Digital Information is specified, then the network is required to set up the call using only end-to-end digital facilities (without the use of robbed-bit signalling, echo cancellers, DCME nor A-law to mu-law conversion), or reject the call if no end-to-end digital circuit is available.

The Bearer Capability is augmented by the Higher Layer Compatibility (HLC) Information Elemen (another field in the Q.931 SETUP message), which informs the network of the use that the caller intends to make of the channel.

References

External links
 ITU-T Recommendation Q.931 paragraph 4.5.5.

Integrated Services Digital Network